TrueCrypt is based on Encryption for the Masses (E4M), an open source on-the-fly encryption program first released in 1997. However, E4M was discontinued in 2000 as the author, Paul Le Roux, began working on commercial encryption software.

Version history

See also 
 TrueCrypt
 VeraCrypt

References 

Software version histories
2004 software
Cross-platform software
Cryptographic software
Discontinued software
Disk encryption
Linux security software
Windows security software
Software that uses wxWidgets
Assembly language software